Horace Francis Clark (November 29, 1815 – June 19, 1873) was an American politician and railroad executive who served two terms as a U.S. Representative from New York from 1857 to 1861.

Biography
Clark was born in Southbury, Connecticut on November 29, 1815, the son of Reverend Daniel Atkinson Clark (1779-1840) and Eliza (Barker) Clark (1787-1864).  In 1833 Clark graduated from Williams College in Williamstown, Massachusetts.  He studied law, was admitted to the bar in 1837, and commenced practice in New York City.  In 1848 he married Maria Louisia Vanderbilt, the daughter of Cornelius Vanderbilt, and they were the parents of a daughter, Mary Louise, who died in 1894.  As a result of his family connection to Vanderbilt, Clark became involved in several of Vanderbilt's business ventures, including shipping, banking, and railroads.

Tenure in Congress 

In 1856, Clark was elected to Congress as a Democrat, and he was reelected in 1858 as an Anti-Lecompton Democrat.  Clark served in the Thirty-fifth and Thirty-sixth Congresses (March 4, 1857 to March 3, 1861).

Later career 
Clark returned to his business interests after leaving Congress, and served as president of the Union Trust Company, Union Pacific Railroad, Michigan Southern Railroad, and other businesses.  In addition, he served on the board of directors of Western Union, and the New York Central and New York, New Haven, and Hartford Railroads.

Death and burial 
He died in New York City on June 19, 1873, and was interred at Woodlawn Cemetery in Bronx, New York.

References

Sources

Books

External links

1815 births
1873 deaths
Williams College alumni
Burials at Woodlawn Cemetery (Bronx, New York)
Democratic Party members of the United States House of Representatives from New York (state)
19th-century American politicians